Seyed Kazem Ghiyassian (February 3, 1940 – February 13, 2014) was an Iranian football player and manager. He played for his hometown teams. After retirement as a football player, he managed several clubs including F.C. Aboomoslem, Payam and Siah Jamegan F.C. He was one of the most experienced football coaches from Mashhad.

Playing career
He played for F.C. Aboomoslem and Payam throughout the 1980s.

Managerial career
He has held various coaching positions (Assistant manager, Head coach, Technical manager and Vice President) with F.C. Aboomoslem and Payam Mashhad throughout the 1990s.

References

1940 births
2014 deaths
Iranian football managers
Payam Mashhad players
Iranian footballers
F.C. Aboomoslem players
Sportspeople from Mashhad
Association football midfielders